Ian Campbell is a Scottish retired amateur football forward and midfielder who made over 210 appearances in the Scottish League for Queen's Park.

References

Scottish footballers
Scottish Football League players
Queen's Park F.C. players
Association football forwards
Living people
Place of birth missing (living people)
Year of birth missing (living people)
Association football midfielders
Scotland amateur international footballers